Cyclin-H is a protein that in humans is encoded by the CCNH gene.

Function 

The protein encoded by this gene belongs to the highly conserved cyclin family, whose members are characterized by a dramatic periodicity in protein abundance through the cell cycle. Cyclins function as regulators of CDK kinases. Different cyclins exhibit distinct expression and degradation patterns which contribute to the temporal coordination of each mitotic event. This cyclin forms a complex with CDK7 kinase and ring finger protein MAT1. The kinase complex is able to phosphorylate CDK2 and CDC2 kinases, thus functions as a CDK-activating kinase (CAK). This cyclin and its kinase partner are components of TFIIH, as well as RNA polymerase II protein complexes. They participate in two different transcriptional regulation processes, suggesting an important link between basal transcription control and the cell cycle machinery.

Interactions 

Cyclin H has been shown to interact with P53, Cyclin-dependent kinase 7 and MNAT1.

References

Further reading